Breaking News is a 2012 Kannada satirical film directed, written and produced by Nagathihalli Chandrashekar. It stars Ajay Rao and Radhika Pandit while actor Ananth Nag makes a special appearance. Stephen Prayog is the music director and Krishna Kumar is the cinematographer of the film. The film got its theatrical release on 18 May 2012.

Plot
The film was well appreciated by the censor board members who said that the director has been able to craft a healthy romantic love story in the backdrop of the contemporary political and the television media channels where fight for TRP's has blinded a level of objectivity in reportage.

Cast 
 Ajay Rao as Arjun
 Radhika Pandit as Shraddha
 Ananth Nag as Somashekar
 Rangayana Raghu as MD
 Arun Sagar as PiKaSo
 Shivaram
 Sihi Kahi Chandru
 Sadhu Kokila
 Karibasavaiah
 Mandya Ramesh
 Biraadar
 Chidandand
 Chi. Guru Dutt
 Swayamvara Chandru
 Kasargod Chinna

Soundtrack

Reception

Critical response 

A critic from The Times of India scored the film at 3.5 out of 5 stars and says "Ajai Rao is at his best as a journalist, Radhika Pandit looks bold and beautiful with a fight too. Rangayana Raghu is at his best as a politician. Music by Stephen Prayag has some catchy tunes. Camera by AV Krishnakumar is good". Srikanth Srinivasa from Rediff.com scored the film at 2.5 out of 5 stars and wrote "The music by Stephen Prayog is okay. The film falls below the benchmark Nagathihalli Chandrashekar set with his earlier films. Krishna Kumar's camera work is just average. Breaking News is a light-hearted movie with bad production values". Shruti I. L from DNA wrote "Ramakrishna, Sangeetha and Doddanna are all well-placed. Hopefully, ‘Malebillhe’ will be the last such role for Digant.  Finally, rainbow is known as Kamanabillu or Malebillu in Kannada, not ‘Malebillhe’ or ‘Malebille’!". A critic from Bangalore Mirror wrote  "Throughout the film, Ajai Rao acts like a trainee reporter who has just been handed a mike and a cameraman to tow him. Only Anant Nag has a real role to play in the film. The rest — from Rangayana Raghu to Sadhu Kokila —  were perhaps roped in for a circus show. The songs have a sense of purpose and are set to good tunes".

References

External links 

Indian satirical films
2012 films
2010s Kannada-language films
Films directed by Nagathihalli Chandrashekhar